Tregeiriog House, Llanishen, Monmouthshire is a farmhouse dating from the late 16th or early 17th centuries. Enlarged in the late 17th century, it was remodelled in the mid-18th century, when it was the home of the Duke of Beaufort's local agent. Still a private residence, it is a Grade II* listed building.

History
The present house has origins in the late 16th or early 17th century, although there is evidence of earlier occupation. In 1749, the farm was owned by Daniel Tregose, Sheriff of Monmouthshire in 1756.

The architectural historian John Newman notes that the house was the home to the Duke of Beaufort's agent in the mid-18th century. By the 21st century the house was in a state of complete dilapidation, but a significant repair programme commenced in 2012. The cellars of the house are home to a colony of 
Lesser horseshoe bats and are designated a Site of Special Scientific Interest (SSSI).

Architecture and description
John Newman considers the oldest part of the house to be the rear cross-wing. Cadw suggests that the five-bay frontage was added in the mid-18th century, intended to unify the appearance of the house. Newman calls it a, "typical 18th century manoeuvre". The interior was significantly remodelled at the same time, and Cadw considers that the extensive cellars were constructed during this remodelling.

Notes

References 
 

Buildings and structures in Monmouthshire
Grade II* listed buildings in Monmouthshire
Country houses in Monmouthshire